{{DISPLAYTITLE:C18H34O3}}
The molecular formula C18H34O3 (molar mass: 298.46 g/mol, exact mass: 298.2508 u) may refer to:

 Castor oil
 Ricinelaidic acid, or (+)-(R)-ricinelaidic acid
 Ricinoleic acid